(former name; Hiromi Isozaki, 磯﨑 浩美) is a former Japanese football player. She played for the Japan national team.

Club career
Ikeda was born in Honjo on December 22, 1975. She joined Tasaki Perule FC in 1995. She was selected for the Best Young Player award in 1995. She was also selected as one of the Best Eleven for 10 years in a row (1999-2008). However, the club was disbanded in 2008 due to financial strain. She retired at the end of the 2008 season. She played 236 matches in the L.League.

National team career
On June 8, 1997, Ikeda debuted for the Japan national team against China. She was a member of the national team for the 1999, 2003, 2007 World Cups; as well as at the 2004 and 2008 Summer Olympics. At the 2004 Summer Olympics, she played as captain because Captain Yumi Obe was held in reserve. After the 2004 Summer Olympics, she became captain until the 2008 Summer Olympics. She played 119 games and scored 4 goals for Japan until 2008.

Personal life
Ikeda got married in 2007 and changed her name from Hiromi Isozaki (磯﨑 浩美) to Hiromi Ikeda (池田 浩美).

National team statistics

International goals

Titles
 1 L.League (2003)
 4 Empress's Cup (1999, 2002, 2003, 2006)

References

External links

Hiromi Ikeda – FIFA competition record

1975 births
Living people
Association football people from Saitama Prefecture
Japanese women's footballers
Japan women's international footballers
Nadeshiko League players
Tasaki Perule FC players
1999 FIFA Women's World Cup players
2003 FIFA Women's World Cup players
2007 FIFA Women's World Cup players
Olympic footballers of Japan
Footballers at the 2004 Summer Olympics
Footballers at the 2008 Summer Olympics
Asian Games medalists in football
Footballers at the 1998 Asian Games
Footballers at the 2006 Asian Games
FIFA Century Club
Women's association football defenders
Asian Games silver medalists for Japan
Asian Games bronze medalists for Japan
Medalists at the 1998 Asian Games
Medalists at the 2006 Asian Games